Nhulunbuy is a town and locality in the Northern Territory of Australia. Founded on the Gove Peninsula in north-east Arnhem Land when a bauxite mine and deep water port were established in the late 1960s, the town’s economy largely revolved around its alumina refinery until it closed in May 2014.

History
This area in Northeast Arnhem Land has been home to the Yolngu Aboriginal people for at least 40,000 years.

Matthew Flinders, in his circumnavigation of Australia in 1803, met the Macassan trading fleet near present-day Nhulunbuy, an encounter that led to the establishment of settlements on Melville Island and the Cobourg Peninsula. A beach close to the township is named Macassan Beach in honour of this encounter.

In 1963, an Australian Government decision excised part of the land for a bauxite mine and alumina refinery to be operated by the North Australian Bauxite and Alumina Company (Nabalco). The Yolngu people at Yirrkala were strongly opposed, and forwarded a bark petition to the Australian House of Representatives, which attracted national and international attention, and which now hangs in Parliament House, Canberra.

To serve the mine, the town of Nhulunbuy was established, housing the workers and their families employed by Nabalco, which became Alcan in 2002.  In 2003, Alcan Gove issued a notice of intent to Government of the Northern Territory re third stage expansion of the alumina refinery. During the 1970s, the population rose to approximately 3,500 with 1,000 students at the combined primary and high school. A new high school was opened in 1981. The mine was later owned by Rio Tinto, which acquired Alcan in 2007.

Nhulunbuy is only  from the Indigenous community of Yirrkala, famous for its Aboriginal art.

The alumina refinery closed in May 2014, which resulted in 1,100 workers being redeployed or made redundant, and reduced the Nhulunbuy population by 700 to 3,240 in the 2016 Australian census.

For the purposes of granting tax rebates to residents of isolated areas as per Section 79A(3F) of the Income Tax Assessment Act 1936, the census population of Nhulunbuy is taken to be less than 2,500, although it was in fact 3,240 in the 2016 census.

In 2019, the Arnhem Space Centre near Nhulunbuy, an equatorial satellite launch facility, was announced. In June 2022, it was announced that NASA would launch three rockets from the Arnhem Space Centre. This is the first time NASA launched a rocket from a commercial launch site outside the United States.

Education

Nhulunbuy includes three schools; Nhulunbuy Primary School, Nhulunbuy High School and Nhulunbuy Christian College. In 1999, the first classes of the Nhulunbuy Christian College (formerly known as Nhulunbuy Christian School) were held at the local TAFE centre, and in 2001 the first building of the new school was completed. In 2007 the NCC Middle School was opened and in 2008 the combined year 8/9 Class was first established. In 2017, Nhulunbuy High School opened a $20 million dollar boarding facility, which provides increased educational opportunities to remote students.

Facilities
 Walkabout Lodge & Tavern
 Dhimurru Aboriginal Corporation
 Endeavour Square, a community shopping centre that includes the northernmost Woolworths supermarket, BWS liquor store and Westpac bank in Australia
 Gove Country Golf Club; northernmost golf course in Australia
 Gove District Hospital
 Gove Boat Club

Refinery closure

On 29 November 2013, Rio Tinto announced the closure of the alumina refinery (but not the bauxite mine) by July 2014 with the loss of 1,100 jobs, or almost 25% of the town's population. The refinery ceased production in May 2014.

Nhulunbuy's population had already dropped by mid 2014, with some of the workforce retained to monitor the shutdown and survey holding ponds full of toxic compounds, but most will be gone by January 2015. A range of measures were announced to support the town and its former workers through the closure and the following three years, but locals anticipate further cuts to services since the school, hospital, power plant and flights were backed by Rio Tinto. The closure of the refinery also left flights on the Darwin-Nhulunbuy route to fall to around 50 to 60 per cent full, causing QantasLink to suspend flights on the route from 17 August 2014.

Media 

As a result of the refinery curtailment and subsequent loss of advertising revenue, Gove's only source of local news, the Arafura Times, published its final issue in mid-October 2016. 

Gove Online publishes news about Nhulunbuy and East Arnhem Land.

In film

A feature film called The Boat With No Name, directed by local filmmaker Phil O'Brien (also an author, musician, and former crocodile farmer, who describes himself as a raconteur), premiered at Gove Boat Club early in 2022. All of the actors are locals, with the lead role taken by O'Brien. Local businesses provided  of funding to the low-budget film, which showcases the area and characters, "and captures the ethos of the East Arnhem region: Indigenous and non-Indigenous people (Yolngu and balanda) working together to create something new".

Climate 
Nhulunbuy has a tropical savannah climate (Aw). Temperatures are hot year round with very warm nights. The wet season lasts from December to May and experiences consistent and very heavy rainfall. Rainfall does occur during the dry season, but it usually is very uncommon and limited. Nhulunbuy has a very narrow temperature range like most tropical climates, with a  temperature range of only 23.8 °C (42.8 °F).

References

External links
 Alcan History of Region archive 2008-07-19
 Lirrwi Tourism Organisation
 Nhulunbuy - Topic - ABC News
 Nhulunbuy Corporation manages the township of Nhulunbuy

Arnhem Land
Mining towns in the Northern Territory
Aboriginal land rights in Australia
Unincorporated areas of the Northern Territory